Phoronis savinkini is a species of marine horseshoe worm in the phylum Phoronida. It is found in the Gulf of Tonkin. The holotype was collected off the coast of Vân Đồn District, Quang Ninh Province in northern Vietnam.

References

Phoronids
Animals described in 2018